Hariabhanga River(also spelt Haribhanga) is a tidal estuarine river in and around the Sundarbans in North 24 Parganas district in the Indian state of West Bengal, bordering on Satkhira District of Bangladesh.

The Ichamati breaks into several distributaries below Hingalganj the chief of which are the Raimangal, Bidya, Jhilla, Kalindi and Jamuna. It follows the international boundary between India and Bangladesh. The New Moore Island is located at the mouth of the Hariabhanga River.

References

Rivers of West Bengal
Rivers of Bangladesh
North 24 Parganas district
Sundarbans
International rivers of Asia
Rivers of India
Rivers of Khulna Division